The Dawson College Blues women's ice hockey team represents Dawson College in the Hockey collégial féminin RSEQ. Their home games are contested at the Ed Meagher Arena (on the Loyola campus of Concordia University) in the west of downtown Montreal, Quebec, Canada.

Sports program in Dawson college
Dawson college has the biggest sports program among the Quebec cégeps. Various sporting programs have been proposed by the Physical Education Athletics and Recreation Center (PARC). Among the various activities proposed by the PARC, the students have arranged the following teams:
 3 basketball men's teams of (A, AA, AAA);
 3 basketball women's teams (A, AA, AAA);
 1 women's ice hockey team (AA);
 1 men's Hockey team;
 1 football men's team;
 1 soccer men's team;
 1 soccer women's team;
 1 rugby men's team;
 1 rugby women's team;
 1 volleyball men's team;
 1 volleyball women's team;
 1 lacrosse men's team;
 1 cheerleading team;
 A golf club;
 A rowing club;

Women's hockey team history
The women's ice hockey team was founded in 1998 by Lionel Geiller. The team would play exhibition games in 1998 and join the Ligue de hockey féminin collégial AA in 1999 to play competitively.

Goaltender Alexandra Garcia led the Blues to the finals in the 2005 Canadian Championships (held in British Columbia). Garcia was named the Player of the Game in the semifinals and finals. For the 2006-07 season, Garcia won the collegiate championship as she posted a 34-0-0 record with the Blues. In addition, she competed for Team Quebec at the 2007 Canada Winter Games and won a bronze medal.

Vanessa Emond played at Dawson College from 2006 to 2008. She accumulated 75 points in her first year (45 goals, 30 assists) for the College. The following season, she had 65 points (34 goals, 31 assists). She was named the Most Valuable Player of her team and represented Team Quebec twice.  Camille Dumais was a two-year member of Dawson College in Montreal and was an assistant captain in 2008-09.

Lauriane Rougeau helped Dawson to a 31-1 record and a runner-up finish in the Collégial AA playoffs of 2008-09. For the season, she led Dawson defenders in scoring. Dawson competed in the 2009 Junion Women's Hockey League Challenge Cup in Washington, D.C. and Rougeau helped the team win the tournament

Season-by-season results
Note: GP = Games played, W = Wins, L = Losses, T = Ties, OTL = Overtime losses, GF = Goals for, GA = Goals against, Pts = Points.

Note: Statistics are not available for years prior to the 2004-05 season.

Season standings
Note: Statistics are not available for years prior to the 2004-05 season.

Playoff results
Following the regular season, a playoff was held to determine the Collégial women's champion in Quebec.

Playoff 2011-12

First round

Semi-finals and Championship Final game 2011-12

Playoff 2010-11

First round
GP = Games played,  W = Wins, L = Losses, OTL = Overtime losses, GF = Goals for, GA = Goals against,  Pts = Points.

The Dawson Blues finished second in group B, and qualified for the semi-finals.

Semi-finals and Championship Final game

Playoff 2009-10

First round
GP = Games played,  W = Wins, L = Losses,  OTL = Overtime losses, GF = Goals for, GA = Goals against,  Pts = Points.

The Dawson Blues finish 5th in the group. The Blues were elimined in the first round and did not qualify for the semi-finals.

Playoffs 2008-09

Semi-finals and Championship Final game

Playoffs 2007-08

Championship final games

Playoffs 2006-07

Championship final games
winner:Dawson Blues

Current roster 2011-12

Coaching staff 2011-12

    Athletic Coordinator:  Paul Rastelli
    Head Coach:   	Scott Lambton
    Assistant Coach:  Andrea Lambton
    Assistant Coach: Emmanuelle Blais
    Assistant Coach: Alyssa Cecere
    Goalie Coach:   Kim St Pierre
    Off-Ice Trainer: John D'Amico

Team awards and honors
2006-07 Ligue de hockey féminin collégial AA Championship.

Individual awards and honors
Awards and individual honors are not available for seasons prior to 2008-09.

2010-11 season
 Rookie of the Year Award: Cassandra Poudrier
 2 Blues were named to All-Star teams: Gabrielle Davidson (forward), Cassandra Poudrier (defensemen),
 Season 2009-10
 2 Blues were named to All-Star teams: Audrey Gariépy (forward), Laurie-Anne Ménard (defensemen).

 Season 2008-09
  Player of the Year Award: Marie-Philip Poulin
 Rookie of the Year Award:  Marie-Philip Poulin
 4 Blues were named to All-Star teams: Marie-Philip Poulin (forward), Vanessa Gagnon (forward), Lauriane Rougeau (defensemen), Émy Côté (goaltender).

Retired numbers
In 2010, Marie-Philip Poulin and Catherine Ward would get their Dawson College numbers retired.

Notable former players
 Emmanuelle Blais
 Catherine Ward
 Ann-Sophie Bettez
 Marie-Philip Poulin

Blues in NCAA

*Blais would win NCAA championships in 2008 and 2010, respectively.

International

Olympic hockey

References

External links
 Blues women's ice hockey team home page on Dawson Athletics Website
 Dawson College Website
 Dawson College Women’s Hockey Program

See also
 Hockey collégial féminin RSEQ
 Coupe Dodge

Women's ice hockey teams in Canada
Ice hockey teams in Montreal
Amateur ice hockey
Youth ice hockey
Dawson College
Women in Quebec